Southwest is one of the six multi-member constituencies of the Althing, the national legislature of Iceland. The constituency was established as Reykjanes in 1959 following the nationwide extension of proportional representation for elections to the Althing. It was renamed Southwest in 2003 when the Reykjanes area of constituency was merged into the Southern constituency following the re-organisation of constituencies across Iceland. Southwest is conterminous with the Capital region but excludes Reykjavík Municipality which has its own constituencies. The constituency currently elects 11 of the 63 members of the Althing using the open party-list proportional representation electoral system. At the 2021 parliamentary election it had 73,699 registered electors.

Electoral system
Southwest currently elects 11 of the 63 members of the Althing using the open party-list proportional representation electoral system. Constituency seats are allocated using the D'Hondt method. Compensatory seats (equalisation seas) are calculated based on the national vote and are allocated using the D'Hondt method at the constituency level. Only parties that reach the 5% national threshold compete for compensatory seats.

Election results

Summary

(Excludes compensatory seats.)

Detailed

2020s

2021
Results of the 2021 parliamentary election held on 25 September 2021:

The following candidates were elected:
Ágúst Bjarni Garðarsson (B), 6,377.75 votes; Bjarni Benediktsson (D), 17,548.75 votes; Bryndís Haraldsdóttir (D), 13,301.38 votes; Gísli Rafn Ólafsson (P), 3,639.50 votes; Guðmundur Ingi Guðbrandsson (V), 7,035.33 votes; Guðmundur Ingi Kristinsson (F), 4,431.00 votes; Jón Gunnarsson (D), 15,421.50 votes; Óli Björn Kárason (D), 11,089.00 votes; Sigmar Guðmundsson (C), 5,032.00 votes; Willum Þór Þórsson (B), 8,508.50 votes; Þorgerður Katrín Gunnarsdóttir (C), 6,582.25 votes; Þórhildur Sunna Ævarsdóttir (P), 4,833.00 votes; and Þórunn Sveinbjarnardóttir (S), 4,683.33 votes.

2010s

2017
Results of the 2017 parliamentary election held on 28 October 2017:

The following candidates were elected:
Bjarni Benediktsson (D), 16,738.00 votes; Bryndís Haraldsdóttir (D), 15,056.75 votes; Gunnar Bragi Sveinsson (M), 5,184.00 votes; Guðmundur Andri Thorsson (S). 6,759.67 votes; Guðmundur Ingi Kristinsson (F), 3,611.33 votes; Jón Gunnarsson (D), 12,851.50 votes; Jón Steindór Valdimarsson (C), 3,972.25 votes; Jón Þór Ólafsson (P), 4,624.00 votes; Ólafur Þór Gunnarsson (V), 5,672.75 votes; Óli Björn Kárason (D), 10,784.12 votes; Rósa Björk Brynjólfsdóttir (V), 7,580.75 votes; Willum Þór Þórsson (B), 4,405.67 votes; and Þorgerður Katrín Gunnarsdóttir (C), 5,116.25 votes.

2016
Results of the 2016 parliamentary election held on 29 October 2016:

The following candidates were elected:
Bjarni Benediktsson (D), 17,778.60 votes; Bryndís Haraldsdóttir (D), 16,152.90 votes; Eygló Harðardóttir (B), 3,894.67 votes; Jón Gunnarsson (D), 14,342.70 votes; Jón Steindór Valdimarsson (C), 5,268.25 votes; Jón Þór Ólafsson (P), 7,211.00 votes; Óli Björn Kárason (D), 12,603.90 votes; Óttarr Proppé (A), 5,449.00 votes; Rósa Björk Brynjólfsdóttir (V), 6,373.67 votes; Theodóra S. Þorsteinsdóttir (A), 4,090.00 votes; Vilhjálmur Bjarnason (D), 10,771.90 votes; Þorgerður Katrín Gunnarsdóttir (C), 6,300.50 votes; and Þórhildur Sunna Ævarsdóttir (P), 5,412.00 votes.

2013
Results of the 2013 parliamentary election held on 27 April 2013:

The following candidates were elected:
Árni Páll Árnason (S), 6,843.8 votes; Birgitta Jónsdóttir (Þ), 2,527.7 votes; Bjarni Benediktsson (D), 14,868.7 votes; Elín Hirst (D), 9,142.7 votes; Eygló Harðardóttir (B), 10,879.2 votes; Guðmundur Steingrímsson (A), 4,664.7 votes; Jón Gunnarsson (D), 12,470.0 votes; Katrín Júlíusdóttir (S), 5,201.5 votes; Ögmundur Jónasson (V), 3,901.3 votes; Ragnheiður Ríkharðsdóttir (D), 13,969.2 votes; Vilhjálmur Bjarnason (D), 10,751.8 votes; Willum Þór Þórsson (B), 9,098.5 votes; and Þorsteinn B. Sæmundsson (B), 7,307.7 votes.

2000s

2009
Results of the 2009 parliamentary election held on 25 April 2009:

The following candidates were elected:
Árni Páll Árnason (S), 15,243.9 votes; Bjarni Benediktsson (D), 13,075.1 votes; Guðfríður Lilja Grétarsdóttir (V), 8,304.7 votes; Jón Gunnarsson (D), 8,460.6 votes; Katrín Júlíusdóttir (S), 13,561.4 votes; Magnús Orri Schram (S), 9,930.9 votes; Ögmundur Jónasson (V), 6,285.5 votes; Ragnheiður Ríkharðsdóttir (D), 9,965.1 votes; Siv Friðleifsdóttir (B), 5,259.0 votes; Þór Saari (O), 4,410.0 votes; Þorgerður Katrín Gunnarsdóttir (D), 10,900.6 votes; and Þórunn Sveinbjarnardóttir (S), 10,859.1 votes.

2007
Results of the 2007 parliamentary election held on 12 May 2007:

The following candidates were elected:
Ármann Kr. Ólafsson (D), 15,978.8 votes; Árni Páll Árnason (S), 8,047.2 votes; Bjarni Benediktsson (D), 17,473.7 votes; Gunnar Svavarsson (S), 12,712.1 votes; Jón Gunnarsson (D), 14,476.1 votes; Katrín Júlíusdóttir (S), 11,224.4 votes; Ögmundur Jónasson (V), 5,199.0 votes; Ragnheiður Ríkharðsdóttir (D), 11,222.3 votes; Ragnheiður Elín Árnadóttir (D), 12,896.4 votes; Siv Friðleifsdóttir (B), 3,169.0 votes; Þorgerður Katrín Gunnarsdóttir (D), 19,133.2 votes; and Þórunn Sveinbjarnardóttir (S), 9,623.2 votes.

2003
Results of the 2003 parliamentary election held on 10 May 2003:

The following candidates were elected:
Árni Mathiesen (D), 16,147.7 votes; Bjarni Benediktsson (D), 9,923.4 votes; Gunnar Birgisson (D), 14,289.2 votes; Gunnar Örn Örlygsson (F), 2,868.0 votes; Guðmundur Árni Stefánsson (S), 13,791.0 votes; Katrín Júlíusdóttir (S), 8,814.4 votes; Rannveig Guðmundsdóttir (S), 12,268.9 votes; Sigríður Anna Þórðardóttir (D), 13,080.9 votes; Siv Friðleifsdóttir (B), 6,298.0 votes; Þorgerður Katrín Gunnarsdóttir (D), 11,589.9 votes; and Þórunn Sveinbjarnardóttir (S), 10,534.0 votes.

1990s

1999
Results of the 1999 parliamentary election held on 8 May 1999:

The following candidates were elected:
Árni Mathiesen (D), 19,870 votes; Árni Ragnar Árnason (D), 19,996 votes; Gunnar Birgisson (D), 19,645 votes; Guðmundur Árni Stefánsson (S), 12,391 votes; Hjálmar Árnason (B), 7,174 votes; Kristján Pálsson (D), 19,968 votes; Rannveig Guðmundsdóttir (S), 12,510 votes; Sigríður Jóhannesdóttir (S), 12,542 votes; Sigríður Anna Þórðardóttir (D), 19,966 votes; Siv Friðleifsdóttir (B), 7,146 votes; Þorgerður Katrín Gunnarsdóttir (D), 19,987 votes; and Þórunn Sveinbjarnardóttir (S), 12,558 votes.

1995
Results of the 1995 parliamentary election held on 8 April 1995:

The following candidates were elected:
Ágúst Einarsson (J), 2,504 votes; Árni Mathiesen (D), 16,302 votes; Árni Ragnar Árnason (D), 16,355 votes; Guðmundur Árni Stefánsson (A), 6,079 votes; Hjálmar Árnason (B), 8,762 votes; Kristín Halldórsdóttir (V), 1,761 votes; Kristján Pálsson (D), 16,305 votes; Ólafur Garðar Einarsson (D), 14,932 votes; Ólafur Ragnar Grímsson (G), 5,266 votes; Rannveig Guðmundsdóttir (A), 6,475 votes; Sigríður Anna Þórðardóttir (D), 16,342 votes; and Siv Friðleifsdóttir (B), 8,761 votes.

1991
Results of the 1991 parliamentary election held on 20 April 1991:

The following candidates were elected:
Anna Ólafsdóttir Björnsson (V), 2,694 votes; Árni Mathiesen (D), 15,751 votes; Árni Ragnar Árnason (D), 15,756 votes; Jón Sigurðsson (A), 9,008 votes; Karl Steinar Guðnason (A), 8,981 votes; Ólafur Garðar Einarsson (D), 15,703 votes; Ólafur Ragnar Grímsson (G), 4,417 votes; Rannveig Guðmundsdóttir (A), 9,007 votes; Salome Þorkelsdóttir (D), 15,719 votes; Sigríður Anna Þórðardóttir (D), 15,830 votes; and Steingrímur Hermannsson (B), 5,386 votes.

1980s

1987
Results of the 1987 parliamentary election held on 25 April 1987:

The following candidates were elected:
Geir Gunnarsson (G), 4,141 votes; Hreggviður Jónsson (S), 3,870 votes; Jóhann Einvarðsson (B), 6,980 votes; Júlíus Sólnes (S), 3,863 votes; Karl Steinar Guðnason (A), 6,430 votes; Kjartan Jóhannsson (A), 6,444 votes; Kristín Halldórsdóttir (V), 3,218 votes; Matthías Árni Mathiesen (D), 10,128 votes; Ólafur Garðar Einarsson (D), 10,147 votes; Salome Þorkelsdóttir (D), 10,196 votes; and Steingrímur Hermannsson (B), 7,042 votes.

1983
Results of the 1983 parliamentary election held on 23 April 1983:

The following candidates were elected:
Geir Gunnarsson (G), 3,984 votes; Guðmundur Einarsson (C), 2,345 votes; Gunnar G. Schram (D), 11,491 votes; Karl Steinar Guðnason (A), 3,860 votes; Kjartan Jóhannsson (A), 4,288 votes; Kristín Halldórsdóttir (V), 2,086 votes; Matthías Árni Mathiesen (D), 12,753 votes; Ólafur Garðar Einarsson (D), 8,937 votes; and Salome Þorkelsdóttir (D), 10,219 votes.

1970s

1979
Results of the 1979 parliamentary election held on 2 and 3 December 1979:

The following candidates were elected:
Geir Gunnarsson (G), 4,679 votes; Jóhann Einvarðsson (B), 4,430 votes; Karl Steinar Guðnason (A), 5,568 votes; Kjartan Jóhannsson (A), 6,187 votes; Matthías Árni Mathiesen (D), 10,170 votes; Ólafur Garðar Einarsson (D), 9,165 votes; and Salome Þorkelsdóttir (D), 8,154 votes.

1978
Results of the 1978 parliamentary election held on 25 June 1978:

The following candidates were elected:
Geir Gunnarsson (G), 4,787 votes; Gils Guðmundsson (G), 5,315 votes; Gunnlaugur Stefánsson (A), 5,776 votes; Karl Steinar Guðnason (A), 6,551 votes; Kjartan Jóhannsson (A), 7,241 votes; Matthías Árni Mathiesen (D), 8,066 votes; Oddur Ólafsson (D), 7,337 votes; and Ólafur Garðar Einarsson (D), 6,525 votes.

1974
Results of the 1974 parliamentary election held on 30 June 1974:

The following candidates were elected:
Axel Jónsson (D), 2,438 votes; Geir Gunnarsson (G), 1,874 votes; Gils Guðmundsson (G), 3,745 votes; Jón Skaftason (B), 3,656 votes; Jón Ármann Héðinsson (A), 2,702 votes; Matthías Árni Mathiesen (D), 9,719 votes; Oddur Ólafsson (D), 8,770 votes; and Ólafur Garðar Einarsson (D), 7,796 votes.

1971
Results of the 1971 parliamentary election held on 13 June 1971:

The following candidates were elected:
Geir Gunnarsson (G), 1,528 votes; Gils Guðmundsson (G), 3,046 votes; Jón Skaftason (B), 3,574 votes; Jón Ármann Héðinsson (A), 2,595 votes; Matthías Árni Mathiesen (D), 6,417 votes; Oddur Ólafsson (D), 5,819 votes; Ólafur Garðar Einarsson (D), 2,164 votes; and Stefán Gunnlaugsson (A), 1,310 votes.

1960s

1967
Results of the 1967 parliamentary election held on 11 June 1967:

The following candidates were elected:
Emil Jónsson (A), 3,189 votes; Geir Gunnarsson (G), 1,097 votes; Gils Guðmundsson (G), 2,189 votes; Jón Skaftason (B), 3,522 votes; Jón Ármann Héðinsson (A), 1,596 votes; Matthías Árni Mathiesen (D), 5,330 votes; Pétur Benediktsson (D), 4,809 votes; and Sverrir Júlíusson (D), 1,788 votes.

1963
Results of the 1963 parliamentary election held on 9 June 1963:

The following candidates were elected:
Emil Jónsson (A), 2,804 votes; Geir Gunnarsson (G), 985 votes; Gils Guðmundsson (G), 1,963 votes; Guðmundur Ívarsson Guðmundsson (A), 1,402 votes; Jón Skaftason (B), 2,465 votes; Matthías Árni Mathiesen (D), 4,536 votes; Ólafur Thors (D), 5,038 votes; and Sverrir Júlíusson (D), 1,680 votes.

1950s

October 1959
Results of the October 1959 parliamentary election held on 25 and 26 October 1959:

The following candidates were elected:
Alfreð Gíslason (D), 1.446 votes; Emil Jónsson (A), 2,910 votes; Finnbogi Rútur Valdimarsson (G), 1,702 votes; Geir Gunnarsson (G), 852 votes; Guðmundur Ívarsson Guðmundsson (A), 1,456 votes; Jón Skaftason (B), 1,760 votes; Matthías Árni Mathiesen (D), 3,903 votes; and Ólafur Thors (D), 4,333 votes.

References

1959 establishments in Iceland
Althing constituencies
Althing constituency
Constituencies established in 1959